John Edmonds (born 1989) is an artist working in photography who lives and works in Brooklyn, New York.

Life and work
In his artistic practice, Edmonds explores themes of community, identity, and desire. Carrie Mae Weems describes Edmonds' as an artist who "re-imagines, and redefines the black man subject."

As of 2019, Edmonds is on faculty at Yale University and The School of Visual Arts.

He has had residencies at Light Work, Skowhegan School of Painting and Sculpture and Fabrica: The United Colors of Benetton's Research Center

Exhibitions
Whitney Biennial 2019, Whitney Museum of American Art, New York, NY. Curated by Rujeko Hockley and Jane Panetta.
tete-a-tete, David Castillo Gallery, Miami, FL
Do You See Me?, the Diggs Gallery at Winston-Salem University, Winston-Salem, North Carolina
James Baldwin/Jim Brown & The Children, The Artist's Institute, New York, NY
Lovers & Friends, Deli Gallery, Long Island City, NY

Collections
Philadelphia Museum of Art
FOAM Museum Amsterdam Library
George Eastman Museum

References

External links
Interview Magazine - John Edmonds By Colleen Kelsey
Cultured Mag - John Edmonds: Young Artists 2018

1989 births
Living people
21st-century American artists
Artists from Washington, D.C.
Yale School of Art alumni
21st-century African-American artists
20th-century African-American people
Skowhegan School of Painting and Sculpture alumni
School of Visual Arts faculty